Narmak is a neighbourhood in north-east Tehran, the capital of Iran.

Located in the 4th and 8th regions, it has 100 little squares named by numbers like "Meidan 68" (68th Square) which some of them are big squares like Haft Hoz and Resalat. The largest square in Narmak is 100th square and the smallest is 99th square. Some famous streets like Ayat, Hengam, Farjam, Dardasht, Golbarg, Samangan, Ghanbarian, and the Resalat Expressway are located in this neighbourhood.

The Iran University of Science and Technology is based in Narmak.

There are four metro stations in Narmak named Elm-o-Sanat University, Sarsabz, Golbarg and Fadak.

Narmak borders Shemiran-no to the north, Tehranpars to the east, Shamsabad to the west, and Vahidieh and Tehranno to the south.

External links
 HaftHoz Narmak - HaftHoz is a well-known shopping center in Narmak and Tehran. There are many squares in Narmak arranged in special formation.

Neighbourhoods in Tehran